Xi may refer to:

Arts and entertainment
 Xi (alternate reality game), a console-based game
 Xi, Japanese name for the video game Devil Dice

Language
Xi (letter), a Greek letter
 Xi, a Latin digraph used in British English to write the sound

People
Xi (surname), any of several Chinese surnames
Xi Jinping, current General Secretary of the Chinese Communist Party since 2012

Places
Xi (state), an ancient Chinese state during the Shang and Zhou Dynasties
Xi County, Henan, China
Xi County, Shanxi, China
Xi River, western tributary of the Pearl River in southern China

Other uses
 Xi (business), a Chinese form of business organization
 Xi baryon, a range of baryons with one up or down quark and two heavier quarks
 Xi, a brand name for the 4G LTE mobile telecommunications service operated by NTT DoCoMo in Japan
 Xi (apartment), a brand name for some apartments constructed by GS Construction in Korea.

See also
 XI (disambiguation)
 11 (disambiguation)
 Kumo Xi, an ancient Mongolic people
 Shuang Xi (双喜, written 囍), a Chinese calligraphic design
 Hsi (disambiguation) — "Xi" and "Hsi" are different transliterations of the same sound in Mandarin Chinese

de:XI
eo:XI
ko:XI
sw:XI
ja:XI
pt:Xi
zh-yue:XI